Edgardo Fabián Prátola (La Plata, 20 May 1969 - La Plata, 28 April 2002) was an Argentine football player.

His career started as a defender with Estudiantes de La Plata, where his devotion was noted as one of the reasons the club returned from relegation in 1995. Prátola wore the No. 6 jersey and was the captain of the team.

Prátola played for Mexican side León between 1996 and 1999, after which he returned to Argentina to play for Unión de Santa Fe, and then returned to Estudiantes in 2000. Diagnosed with colon cancer in 2000, he broke the news himself in an unassuming way, quit the team after unsuccessful surgery, and fought his illness to the end. The day before his death he asked that Estudiantes play their next match (against Independiente) and not ask for a postponement. A touching ceremony was held before the game.

He is fondly remembered by Estudiantes fans by his nickname El Ruso (the Russian).

After winning the Apertura 2006 championship in a play-off against Boca Juniors, many Estudiantes players displayed T-shirts in honour of Prátola. Then-captain Juan Sebastian Verón mentioned him in an emotional victory speech broadcast around the stadium, leading to chanting of "Ruso" by Estudiantes fans.

Prátola was again remembered by Estudiantes following the club's triumph in the 2009 Copa Libertadores finals against Cruzeiro. In the post-match celebrations, Estudiantes players wore shirts that said, "Ruso, estás con nosotros" ("Ruso, you are with us").

External links
 News story about his death
 La Nacion obituary

1969 births
2002 deaths
Footballers from La Plata
Argentine footballers
Estudiantes de La Plata footballers
Unión de Santa Fe footballers
Club León footballers
Argentine Primera División players
Liga MX players
Argentine expatriate footballers
Expatriate footballers in Mexico
Deaths from colorectal cancer
Deaths from cancer in Argentina
Association football defenders